Typhula variabilis is a plant pathogen infecting carrots.

References

Fungal plant pathogens and diseases
Carrot diseases
Typhulaceae
Fungi described in 1790